Araucaria araucana, commonly called the monkey puzzle tree, monkey tail tree, piñonero, pewen or Chilean pine, is an evergreen tree growing to a trunk diameter of  and a height of . It is native to central and southern Chile and western Argentina. It is the hardiest species in the conifer genus Araucaria. Because of the prevalence of similar species in ancient prehistory, it is sometimes called a living fossil. It is also the national tree of Chile. Its conservation status was changed to Endangered by the IUCN in 2013 due to the dwindling population caused by logging, forest fires, and grazing.

Description 

According to Lusk, the leaves have an average lifespan of 24 years and so cover most of the tree except for the older branches.

It is usually dioecious, with the male and female cones on separate trees, though occasional individuals bear cones of both sexes. It is wind pollinated. The female (seed) cones, which mature in autumn about 18 months after pollination, are globose, large,  in diameter, and hold about 200 seeds.

The thick bark of Araucaria araucana may be an adaptation to wildfire.

Habitat 

The tree’s native habitat is the lower slopes of the Chilean and Argentine south-central Andes, typically above . Juvenile trees exhibit a broadly pyramidal or conical habit which naturally develops into the distinctive umbrella form of mature specimens as the tree ages. It prefers well-drained, slightly acidic, volcanic soil, but will tolerate almost any soil type provided it drains well. Seedlings are often not competitive enough to survive unless grown in a canopy gap or exposed isolated area. The species is hardly ever found in the same communities as Husquea culeou, Nothofagus dombeyi and Nothofagus pumilio, this is due to these species out competing the A. araucana individuals

Seed dispersal 
Araucaria araucana is a masting species, and rodents are important consumers and dispersers of its seeds. The long-haired grass mouse, Abrothrix longipilis, is the most important animal responsible for dispersing the seeds of A.araucana. This rodent buries seeds whole in locations favorable for seed germination, unlike other animals.

Another important seed dispersal agent is members of the parakeet species Enicognathus ferrugineus. Adult trees are highly resistant to large ecological disturbances caused by volcanic activity, after events like these the parakeets play their role by dispersing the seeds far from effected territory.

Threats
Logging, long a major threat, was finally banned in 1990. Large fires burned thousands of acres of Araucaria forest in 2001–2002, and areas of national parks have also burned, destroying trees over 1300 years old. Overgrazing and invasive trees are also threats. Extensive human harvesting of piñones (Araucaria seeds) can prevent new trees from growing. A Global Trees Campaign project that planted 2000 trees found a 90percent 10-year survival rate.

Cultivation and uses 
Araucaria araucana is a popular garden tree, planted for the unusual effect of its thick, "reptilian" branches with very symmetrical appearance. It is far and away the hardiest member of its genus, and can grow well in western and central Europe (north to the Faroe Islands and Smøla in western Norway), the west coast of North America (north to Baranof Island in Alaska), and locally on the east coast, as far north as Long Island, and in New Zealand, southeastern Australia and south east Ireland. It is tolerant of coastal salt spray, but does not tolerate exposure to pollution.

Its piñones, or seeds, are edible, similar to large pine nuts, and are harvested by indigenous peoples in Argentina and Chile. The tree has some potential to be a food crop in other areas in the future, thriving in climates with cool oceanic summers, e.g., western Scotland, where other nut crops do not grow well. A group of six female trees with one male for pollination could yield several thousand seeds per year. Since the cones drop, harvesting is easy. The tree, however, does not yield seeds until it is around 30 to 40 years old, which discourages investment in planting orchards (although yields at maturity can be immense); once established, individuals can achieve ages beyond 1,000 years. Pest losses to rodents and feral Sus scrofa limits the yields for human consumption and forage fattening of livestock by A. araucana mast. A. araucana has a high degree of inter-year variability in mast volume, and this variation is synchronous within a given area. This evolved to take advantage of predator satiety.

Once valued because of its long, straight trunk, its current rarity and vulnerable status mean its wood is now rarely used; it is also sacred to some members of the Mapuche Native American tribe. Before the tree became protected by law in 1971, lumber mills in Araucanía Region specialized in Chilean pine.

The species is protected under Appendix I of the Convention on International Trade in Endangered Species (CITES) meaning international trade (including in parts and derivatives) is regulated by the CITES permitting system and commercial trade in wild sourced specimens is prohibited.

Naming 

First identified by Europeans in Chile in the 1780s, it was named Pinus araucana by Molina in 1782. In 1789, de Jussieu erected a new genus called Araucaria based on the species, and in 1797, Pavón published a new description of the species which he called Araucaria imbricata (an illegitimate name, as it did not use Molina's older species epithet). Finally, in 1873, after several further redescriptions, Koch published the combination Araucaria araucana, validating Molina's species name. The name araucana is derived from the native Araucanians who used the nuts (seeds) of the tree in Chile. A group of Araucanians living in the Andes, the Pehuenches, owe their name to their diet based on the harvesting of the A. araucaria seeds. Pehuen means Araucaria and che means people in Mapudungun.

The origin of the popular English language name "monkey puzzle" derives from its early cultivation in Britain in about 1850, when the species was still very rare in gardens and not widely known. Sir William Molesworth, the owner of a young specimen at Pencarrow garden near Bodmin in Cornwall, was showing it to a group of friends, when one of them – the noted barrister and Benthamist Charles Austin –  remarked, "It would puzzle a monkey to climb that". As the species had no existing popular name, first "monkey puzzler", then "monkey puzzle" stuck.

Relatives 
The nearest extant relative is Araucaria angustifolia, a South American Araucaria from Brazil which differs in the width of the leaves. Members of other sections of the genus Araucaria occur in Pacific Islands and in Australia, and include Araucaria cunninghamii, hoop pine, Araucaria heterophylla, the Norfolk Island pine and Araucaria bidwillii, bunya pine.

The recently found 'Wollemi pine', Wollemia, discovered in southeast Australia, is classed in the plant family Araucariaceae. Their common ancestry dates to a time when Australia, Antarctica, and South America were linked by land – all three continents were once part of the supercontinent known as Gondwana.

Gallery

References

External links 

  Listed as Vulnerable (VU B1+2c v2.3)
 
 
 
 
 
 

araucana
Trees of Argentina
Flora of central Chile
Trees of Chile
Edible nuts and seeds
Trees of mild maritime climate
Ornamental trees
Vulnerable plants
Plants described in 1782
Pinales of Argentina
Pinales of Chile
Flora of the Valdivian temperate rainforest